Maciej Terlecki (born 9 March 1977) is a Polish footballer. His father was ex-player Stan Terlecki.

References

1977 births
Living people
People from Pruszków
Polish footballers
Poland international footballers
Polish expatriate footballers
Association football midfielders
Znicz Pruszków players
Polonia Warsaw players
R.S.C. Anderlecht players
Expatriate footballers in Belgium
ŁKS Łódź players
Widzew Łódź players
Ruch Chorzów players
OKS Stomil Olsztyn players
Wisła Płock players
Pogoń Szczecin players
Radomiak Radom players
Ekstraklasa players
Sportspeople from Masovian Voivodeship